The fourth series of British science fiction television programme Doctor Who was preceded by the 2007 Christmas special "Voyage of the Damned". Following the special, a regular series of thirteen episodes aired, starting with "Partners in Crime" on 5 April 2008 and ending with "Journey's End" three months later on 5 July 2008.

"Partners in Crime" marked the debut of Donna Noble, as played by Catherine Tate, as a full-time companion to the Tenth Doctor, after she first appeared in the 2006 Christmas special, "The Runaway Bride". Freema Agyeman also returns as the Doctor's companion Martha Jones from the previous series. John Barrowman, Elisabeth Sladen, Noel Clarke and Camille Coduri also returned to appear in the series finale, as well as Billie Piper, who appeared as Rose Tyler in six episodes of the series.

The series started production on 8 August 2007 and concluded on 29 March 2008. A short Children in Need special titled "Time Crash" was also produced and before "Voyage of the Damned", as well as a mini-episode entitled "Music of the Spheres", which was premiered at the Doctor Who Prom after the fourth series finale in July 2008. The fourth series was the final full series to star David Tennant as the Doctor, but he remained as the Tenth Doctor in the 2008–2010 specials, and is set to appear as the Fourteenth Doctor in the 2023 specials. This is also the last regular series to have Russell T Davies as the lead writer and showrunner until the 14th series, which is set to premiere in 2024. The series incorporates a loose story arc consisting of recurring mentions of the disappearance of bees from planet Earth and the loss of various planets and moons.

Episodes

Supplemental episode

Casting

Main characters

The fourth series marked David Tennant's third and final full series as the Doctor, although he continued in the role for the 2008–2010 specials. In the Christmas special, Australian actress and singer Kylie Minogue starred as one-time companion Astrid Peth, who died during the events of the episode. The companions in the regular series had all been in the lead companion role previously: the primary role of Donna Noble, who was introduced in "The Runaway Bride", was played by Catherine Tate for all thirteen episodes. Her return was announced by the BBC on 3 July 2007. Freema Agyeman, who portrayed the Doctor's companion Martha Jones in series three, returned for "The Sontaran Stratagem", "The Poison Sky", "The Doctor's Daughter", "The Stolen Earth" and "Journey's End". Billie Piper, who played Rose Tyler from the first episode of the first series to the finale of the second series appeared in the three final episodes of the series. She made brief appearances in the episodes "Partners in Crime", "The Poison Sky" and "Midnight". Her return had been planned by Davies since her departure in 2006, and was officially announced on 27 November 2007. John Barrowman, Elisabeth Sladen, Noel Clarke and Camille Coduri, who portrayed previous companions Jack Harkness, Sarah Jane Smith, Mickey Smith and Jackie Tyler respectively, also reappeared in the finale.

Guest stars
Recurring guest stars for the series included Bernard Cribbins and Jacqueline King as Donna's grandfather Wilfred Mott and mother Sylvia Noble. Penelope Wilton returned as shamed former prime minister Harriet Jones in "The Stolen Earth", her first appearance since "The Christmas Invasion". Noel Clarke and Camille Coduri reprised their roles as Mickey Smith and Jackie Tyler in "Journey's End". Adjoa Andoh returned as Martha Jones' mother Francine in the finale. Eve Myles, Gareth David-Lloyd and Tommy Knight also starred in the finale in their respective roles of Gwen Cooper, Ianto Jones and Luke Smith from spin-off series Torchwood and The Sarah Jane Adventures. This marked their first appearances in Doctor Who itself, although Eve Myles had previously featured in "The Unquiet Dead" as a direct ancestor of Gwen called Gwyneth.

The fourth series featured a large number of high-profile stars such as Kylie Minogue (Astrid Peth in "Voyage of the Damned"), Alex Kingston and Steve Pemberton (River Song and Strackman Lux respectively in "Silence in the Library" / "Forest of the Dead"), Sarah Lancashire (Miss Foster in "Partners in Crime"), and Phil Davis and Peter Capaldi (Lucius and Caecillus respectively in "The Fires of Pompeii"). Other guest stars included Sasha Behar, Tim McInnerny, Colin Morgan, Christopher Ryan, Georgia Moffett (daughter of Fifth Doctor actor Peter Davison and later wife of David Tennant), Nigel Terry, Felicity Kendal, Fenella Woolgar, Felicity Jones, Tom Goodman-Hill, Colin Salmon, Lesley Sharp, Lindsey Coulson, David Troughton (son of Second Doctor actor Patrick Troughton), and Chipo Chung (who had previously portrayed Chantho in "Utopia"). Evolutionary biologist Richard Dawkins and Paul O'Grady made cameo appearances as themselves in "The Stolen Earth".

Production

Development
All of the episode titles were revealed in the 5 April 2008 issue of the Radio Times, except the title of the twelfth, which was "being kept secret as it gives away too much." The article also identified the title of episode 9 as "River's Run", as did the press release for the subsequent issue of Doctor Who Magazine, but this was changed a few days afterwards to "Forest of the Dead". The title of episode 12 was eventually revealed in a press release as "The Stolen Earth". A Children in Need special, entitled "Time Crash", was produced alongside the series and was broadcast on 16 November 2007. In addition, a mini-episode entitled "Music of the Spheres" was shot on 3 May 2008 for series 4 and was premiered at the Doctor Who Prom on 27 July 2008, with the audio being broadcast simultaneously on BBC Radio 3. It was then broadcast on BBC One on New Year's Day 2009.

Like the previous three series, all of the episodes are bound together in a loose story arc. In previous series, the story arcs were in the form of an arc word, such as Bad Wolf, Torchwood, or Mr Saxon, but the arc for the fourth series is cumulative: Doctor Who Magazines preview of "Partners in Crime" described the arc as "an element from every episode–whether it's a person, a phrase, a question, a planet, or a mystery –builds up to the grand finale". Multiple mentions were made about the bees disappearing from planet Earth and stories driven by a missing or lost planet. Executive producer Russell T Davies stated in the same feature that the series' finale had been planned for three years previous to its airdate. The regular series focuses heavily on Donna: David Tennant stated that the "whole thirteen weeks is Donna's story ... why she's with the Doctor again is the subtext", and producer Phil Collinson cited Donna as a "fresh dynamic" for the fourth series.

Writing
Doctor Who Magazine gradually revealed writers for the series alongside episode announcements. First-time writers for the programme included James Moran, co-writer of the 2006 horror film Severance, and Keith Temple, who had written episodes of Byker Grove and Casualty. Previous writers Gareth Roberts, Stephen Greenhorn, Helen Raynor and Steven Moffat all contributed to the series, with Russell T Davies continuing to act as head writer and executive producer. Tom MacRae had written an episode for this series, entitled "Century House", but this was replaced after Russell T Davies decided that it was too close in tone to Gareth Roberts' "The Unicorn and the Wasp". Amanda Coe was also due to write an episode, but it fell through due to undisclosed reasons. This was Phil Collinson's last series as producer, as well as Russell T Davies and Julie Gardner's last full series as executive producers, all having worked on the programme since its return. Susie Liggat produced five episodes (blocks 2, 5 and 7), as she did in series 3 with "Human Nature" / "The Family of Blood".

Music
Murray Gold returned to compose the soundtrack to Series 4, with Ben Foster orchestrating.

Filming
Doctor Who had been recommissioned for a fourth series in March 2007, shortly before the broadcast of the third series. The production schedule called for 15 full episodes to be produced, rather than the usual 14, due to the announcement that the next full series of Doctor Who would not air until 2010. This schedule meant that the programme would be unable to enter production during the second half of 2008. The 15 episodes consisted of 13 regular episodes and the 2007 and 2008 Christmas specials. Recording for the 2007 Christmas special began on 9 July 2007, with production on the series itself beginning on 8 August 2007 and concluding on 29 March 2008. The tenth production block – consisting of 2008 Christmas special "The Next Doctor" and the BBC Proms "cutaway" scene "Music of the Spheres" — completed recording on 3 May.

Production blocks were arranged as follows:

Release

Promotion
On 1 February 2008, the BBC announced that, in a partnership with Carlton Screen Advertising, a 90-second film trailer of the fourth series would be shown in cinemas across Britain "before the most anticipated new releases". The trailer was aired on British television on 22 March 2008. As with the third series and every series subsequently, the stars of the programme and production crew attended a premiere in central London where the first two episodes of the series were screened.

Broadcast
The fourth series premiered on 5 April 2008 with "Partners in Crime", and concluded after 13 episodes on 5 July 2008 with "Journey's End". Doctor Who Confidential also aired alongside each episode of the series, continuing on from the previous series.

Home media

DVD and Blu-ray releases

UMD releases

In print

Reception

Critical reception
The fourth series received positive reviews from critics. The series is considered among critics as one of the greatest of the revived era of the programme, as the series saw the revived era at its peak in popularity. The series finale "The Stolen Earth" / "Journey's End" received an Appreciation Index score of 91, the highest ever for an episode of Doctor Who and one of the highest ever given to a television programme. A poll conducted by Radio Times in 2015 found that readers voted the fourth series finale as the greatest finale of the programme.

Ben Rawson-Jones of Digital Spy gave the series four out of five stars, stating that "a winning mixture of elation and poignancy ensured that the season achieved a great tonal balance where neither light nor dark was allowed to fully overwhelm the other". He praised Tate's performance, by saying of the series that "at the core was Catherine Tate's excellent performance as Donna Noble, a refreshing contrast to the effervescent spirits of Rose and Martha". He also praised the tone of the series, stating that "Russell T. Davies deserves great praise for assembling such a diverse range of stories". However, Rawson-Jones was critical of certain monsters lacking "menace"; he named the Sontarans as an example and stated that the execution of UNIT "was a genuine letdown".

Den of Geek gave an overwhelmingly positive review of the series, giving it four stars out of five, believing it to be the most consistent series of the revived era so far, and of the programme as a whole. They praised the special effects, citing "The Fires of Pompeii", "Planet of the Ood" and the finale as "the epitome of what The Mill can do". Den of Geek further praised the acting talents of David Tennant and Catherine Tate, saying "never have we had it so good... she [Tate] displayed such a fine grasp of character that even David Tennant was left slightly in the shade by her energetic, thoughtful, hopeful and achingly sorrowful (not to mention damn funny to boot) performance". However, they also criticised the familiarity of the Sontaran two-parter and the hollowness of "Voyage of the Damned". Overall, Den of Geek summarized the series as "astonishing", stating that "series four was never anything less than stunning, there were no 'lows' it was all 'highs'".

David Cornelius of DVD Talk stated that "It's the best season yet...every episode in this season is a highlight". He too praised Tate's performance, declaring her as "the new series' best companion yet." Cornelius went on to state that Davies' and Tennant's final series was the series "we'll always remember as the year Davies and Tennant went out on top". He further praised the cast and crew as a whole, complimenting "the excellent guest stars, the impressive set designs, the sharp direction and the detailed creature makeup". Overall, Cornelius summarized that "the fourth season of Doctor Who is outstanding television...and a monumental work of storytelling".

Travis Fickett of IGN gave the series a rating of 7.5 out of 10. Summarizing the series, he stated that "Overall, this season is a mixed bag. I enjoyed Donna more than Martha and less than Rose. It was a let down to see the Daleks as the villains yet again, especially after the terrific appearance by The Master. The Sontarans were original and fun, but nothing to write home about." Fickett stated that Moffat's episodes, "Silence in the Library" / "Forest of the Dead", and Davies' episodes, "Midnight" and "Turn Left", were the highlights of the series.

Awards and nominations

Soundtrack 
Selected pieces of score from this series (from "Voyage of the Damned" to "Journey's End"), as composed by Murray Gold, were released on 17 November 2008 by Silva Screen Records. 27 tracks were released on a single CD, with a total length of 76 minutes, 27 seconds.

References

External links 

 
 
 

2007 British television seasons
2008 British television seasons
Series 04
Series 04